Henri Gérin (April 13, 1900 – September 2, 1941) was a Canadian politician in Quebec, Canada. He was a Member of the Legislative Assembly of Quebec (MLA).

Early life

He was born on April 13, 1900 in Coaticook, Eastern Townships.

Member of the legislature

Gérin ran as a Union Nationale candidate in the provincial district of Stanstead in the by-election held on November 2, 1938 and won.  He was defeated in the 1939 election.

Death

He died on September 2, 1941.

References

1900 births
1941 deaths
Union Nationale (Quebec) MNAs